BBC America is an American basic cable network that is jointly owned by BBC Studios and AMC Networks. The channel primarily airs sci-fi and action series and films, as well as selected programs from the BBC (such as its nature documentary series).

Unlike the BBC's domestic channels in the United Kingdom, BBC America does not receive funding from the British licence fee (which is the principal funding for the BBC's channels within the United Kingdom), as the BBC cannot fund any of its channels that are available outside the United Kingdom. Consequently, BBC America operates as a commercial-supported channel and accepts traditional advertising. It is also funded by television subscription fees.

As of September 2018, BBC America is available to about 80.9 million television households (87.8% of pay television customers) in the United States.

History
BBC America was launched on March 29, 1998, presenting a mixture of comedy, drama and lifestyle programs from BBC Television and other British television broadcasters including ITV and Channel 4. In the channel's early days, it focused on repeats of popular lifestyle shows such as Changing Rooms and Ground Force. BBC America's head of television programming later stated that the channel needed to establish a niche, since non-British viewers found the lifestyle shows appealing. Most of the newer programs appeared as part of BBC America's evening schedule.

The network removed the British soap opera EastEnders from its schedule in 2003 due to low ratings; however, the program's removal from BBC America provoked complaints from viewers, which caught media attention.

After CEO Paul Lee was appointed president of ABC Family in 2009, the network appointed Bill Hilary from Comedy Central to serve as its chief executive officer. Hilary appointed Kathryn Mitchell to the new position of general manager. Under Hilary's tenure, BBC America was restructured; it moved its main offices to New York City and had its programming budget increase substantially. The channel was led by Garth Ancier, who served as the president of BBC Worldwide Americas from February 2007 until 2010, when he was succeeded by former MTV Networks executive Herb Scannell. Meanwhile, Perry Simon serves as general manager.

In 2014, AMC Networks acquired a 49.9% equity stake in BBC America for $200 million, and replaced Discovery Communications as its managing partner. As part of the deal, AMC Networks also took on the responsibility of negotiating U.S. broadcast and advertising sales for the BBC World News channel. AMC Networks CEO Josh Sapan stated that the deal gave his company "a powerful collection of networks that are among the most critically acclaimed, with distinct dramas and other potent content that creates a deep connection with viewers", while BBC Worldwide CEO Tim Davie considered it "an opportunity to grow the creative quality and ambition from an already high base."

On Sunday, April 25, 2021, BBC America unveiled a redesigned logo and tagline - “Brit-ish”.

AMC Networks is also a partner in the US operations of BritBox, an over-the-top subscription service focused on British television operated by BBC Studios and ITV plc.

Programming

Current
 Dirk Gently's Holistic Detective Agency
 The Graham Norton Show
 Monty Python's Flying Circus
 Star Trek: The Next Generation
 Law and Order
Bones
Saturday daytime Wonderstruck nature block

Some of the programs on the channel are edited either for adult content or to allow for commercials. Occasionally, comedy shows are run in specially formatted 40-minute blocks and a few first-run drama programs are broadcast in a longer block that allows them to run to their original broadcast length. Additional series that has been previously broadcast may periodically return to the schedule as part of the network's rotation of daytime programming.

Original programming and co-productions
In the mid-2000s, BBC America produced a few of its own shows along with some joint productions,  including Sharpe's Challenge, part of the Sharpe series of made-for-television movies and co-produced with ITV; and The State Within and Jekyll, which were co-productions with the BBC. The first original series produced solely by the channel was Copper, which premiered in the summer of 2012.

BBC America has also branched into co-producing British series, including Robin Hood, The Musketeers, Killing Eve, Mood and from its fourth series, the revival of Doctor Who (until 2022). They also co-produced the Canadian series Orphan Black.

Newscasts

BBC America used to broadcast BBC World News each Monday through Friday morning from 6:00 to 8:00 am Eastern and Pacific Time. All news programs now air exclusively on the BBC World News channel, also distributed by AMC Networks in the United States.

The weekday morning (6:00–9:00 am Eastern) simulcast used to include BBC World News bulletins, World Business Report, Sport Today, Asia Today, and a one-hour bulletin called World News Today. Most of these were removed from the schedule without any announcement on April 6, 2009. The weekend morning (6:00–6:30 am ET) simulcast was also abruptly dropped on April 4, 2009. According to BBC America, the simulcast was dropped because of disappointing ratings.

From 2007 to 2011, BBC America broadcast BBC World News America, a live Washington, DC–based program anchored by Matt Frei. Katty Kay served as a Washington-based correspondent. On February 18, 2011, network management announced that BBC World News America would be dropped from BBC America and would instead be broadcasting only on the BBC World News channel and PBS member stations in the United States.

The network was in discussions to unveil a weekly news program fronted by Newsnight host Jeremy Paxman, who was to introduce a synopsis of Newsnight items with an international aspect and was expected to bring his brash interviewing style to bear on American politicians. An international edition of Newsnight debuted on February 29, 2008, in the 10-pm time slot. This program was cancelled in November 2008, but the announcement of the program's cancellation was not made until April 2009.

During major breaking news events, the network sometimes replaces scheduled programs with coverage from BBC World News; the London bombings in July 2005 was one example. BBC World News's American coverage started out sparse, but has expanded within the last decade on several providers throughout the United States, generally alongside BBC America as part of AMC Networks' retransmission consent negotiations (one previous example is New York City-based Cablevision, which did not carry BBC America until August 2011) or BBC World News America, an American-focused news program presented by Katty Kay and usually from Washington, DC, mainly carried by American public television stations through a distribution agreement with Washington PBS member station WETA-TV.

Sports 
BBC America has carried coverage of the PDC World Darts Championship in simulcast with Sky Sports, with preliminary rounds streaming, and the finals airing on television.

Outside the U.S.

BBC America is available in Caribbean countries, such as Bermuda on One Communications's cable service, and the World on Wireless service, as well as the Bahamas on REVTV, in Barbados on Flow, in the Cayman Islands on Logic TV, Grenada on Flow, Telbo MiTV in Bonaire, in Curaçao on Flow and on SXM Cable & Data in Sint Maarten. It is also available in the Pacific in the US territory of Guam on DoCoMo Pacific and GTA Teleguam's IPTV service, as well as in the Northern Marianas on DoCoMo Pacific.

References

External links

Television networks in the United States
International BBC television channels
English-language television stations in the United States
Television channels and stations established in 1998
1998 establishments in New York (state)
AMC Networks
BBC Worldwide
Joint ventures